The United States Post Office, located at 1701 Charleston Ave., is the former main post office of Mattoon, Illinois. The post office was constructed in 1913 by Mangnus Yeager & Son, a building company from Danville, Illinois. The building was designed in the Classical Revival style and features Renaissance Revival influences; James K. Taylor was the Supervising Architect for the building. The front of the building features seven arches in front of a portico containing the entrance, which is located at the top of a marble staircase. The three central arches are topped by a carved frieze, and marble cartouches separate each pair of arches. The building served as Mattoon's post office from its construction until 1980, when a new post office opened.

The building was listed on the National Register of Historic Places in 1979.

See also 
List of United States post offices

References 

Post office buildings on the National Register of Historic Places in Illinois
Neoclassical architecture in Illinois
Government buildings completed in 1913
Buildings and structures in Coles County, Illinois
National Register of Historic Places in Coles County, Illinois
1913 establishments in Illinois